The Back River is a short tributary of the Meduncook River in Friendship, Maine.

See also 
 List of rivers of Maine

References 

 
 Maine Streamflow Data from the USGS
 Maine Watershed Data From Environmental Protection Agency

Rivers of Knox County, Maine
Rivers of Maine